Live at Cafe Au Go Go is a live album by blues musician John Lee Hooker with members of Muddy Waters Blues Band recorded at the Cafe Au Go Go and released by the BluesWay label in 1967.

Reception

AllMusic reviewer Richie Unterberger stated: "A decent if somewhat low-key electric set, recorded in August of 1966. One of his better live bands, featuring support from Otis Spann and other members of Muddy Waters' group".

Track listing
All compositions credited to John Lee Hooker
 "I'm Bad Like Jesse James" – 5:03
 "She's Long, She's Tall (She Weeps Like a Willow Tree)" – 3:08
 "When My First Wife Left Me" – 3:42
 "Heartaches and Misery" – 5:10
 "One Bourbon, One Scotch and One Beer" – 4:05
 "I Don't Want No Trouble" – 4:09
 "I'll Never Get Out of These Blues Alive" – 4:18
 "Seven Days" – 3:42

Personnel
John Lee Hooker – guitar, vocals
Otis Spann – piano
Muddy Waters, Sammy Lawhorn, Luther "Snake Boy" Johnson – guitar
Mac Arnold – bass
Francis Clay – drums

References

John Lee Hooker live albums
1967 live albums
BluesWay Records live albums
Albums produced by Bob Thiele